Time Bombs is a 2008 Canadian film directed by Guylaine Maroist and Éric Ruel. It was produced by "Productions de la ruelle".

Plot 
In the spring of 1957, 40 young Canadian soldiers were sent to Nevada on a top secret mission. These young men did not know they would be used as guinea pigs in the most important nuclear testing program of the Cold War. The American military wanted to know how the average soldier would hold up on a nuclear battlefield.

The effects were devastating. Many of the men fell gravely ill, and some of their children were born with deformities or handicaps.

The controversial operation has never received official recognition from the Canadian government. 50 years after the tests, Time Bombs follows the Atomic Veterans in their quest for recognition from the government.

Technical information 

 Production: Les Productions de la ruelle inc.
 Producers: Guylaine Maroist and Éric Ruel
 Directors: Guylaine Maroist and Éric Ruel
 Original idea: Pierre Brisson et Véronique Morin
 Voice over: Vlasta Vrana and Réal Bossé
 Director of photography: Steeve Desrosiers, Douglas Munro, c.s.c. and Jean-François Perreault
 Visual mixing: Éric Ruel
 Sound editing: Louis Dupire and Eric Ruel
 Sound mixing: Jean-Paul Vialard, ONF
 Scenario: Guylaine Maroist
 Research: Pierre Brisson, Guylaine Maroist and Véronique Morin
 Visual research: Ginette Beauchemin and Éric Ruel

Awards
 2008 won the golden ribbon award for best documentary from the Canadian Association of Broadcasters 
 2008 won the grand jury prize for best documentary at the New York International Independent Film Festival

See also 
 Operation Plumbbob

References

External links
 Official website
 Productions de la ruelle website

Canadian documentary films
Cold War military history of Canada
Documentary films about nuclear war and weapons
Quebec films
Documentary films about veterans
2000s English-language films
2000s Canadian films